The women's mass start race of the 2015–16 ISU Speed Skating World Cup 4, arranged in the Thialf arena in Heerenveen, Netherlands, was held on 13 December 2015.

Misaki Oshigiri of Japan won the race, while Carien Kleibeuker of the Netherlands came second, and Ivanie Blondin of Canada came third. Janneke Ensing of the Netherlands won the Division B race.

Results

The race took place on Sunday, 13 December, with Division A scheduled at 17:07, and Division B scheduled at 17:45 (both in the afternoon session).

Division A

Division B

References

Women mass start
4